"And Then We Dance" is the debut single by season four winners of Australia's Got Talent, Justice Crew. It was written and produced by Darhyl Camper, Nicholas "RAS" Furlong and Jordan "Infinity" Suecof. The song was released digitally on 27 August 2010. "And Then We Dance" peaked at number 26 on the ARIA Singles Chart and was certified platinum by the Australian Recording Industry Association (ARIA). An accompanying music video was directed by Marc Furmie, and features Justice Crew performing several types of dance routines in an underground parking lot.

Background and release
On 12 August 2010, it was announced that Justice Crew had signed a recording contract with Sony Music Australia. Emmanuel Rodriguez, a member of the group said: "Sony asked if any of us could sing and we showed them what we could do. A week later, we were in the recording studio." "And Then We Dance" was written and produced by Darhyl Camper, Nicholas "RAS" Furlong and Jordan Seucof. A preview of the song was released on YouTube on 16 August, and the single cover was revealed on 20 August. "And Then We Dance" was sent to Australian contemporary hit radio on 23 August, and was released digitally on 27 August. The Compact Disc single was also released the same date.

Chart performance
On 13 September 2010, "And Then We Dance" debuted at number 46 on the ARIA Singles Chart, and peaked at number 26 on 11 October. The song was certified platinum by the Australian Recording Industry Association (ARIA), for selling 70,000 copies.

Music video and live performances
The music video for the song was directed by Marc Furmie and was filmed in a parking lot near the Acer Arena in Sydney. The video premiered online on 27 August 2010. Throughout the video, it shows Justice Crew in an underground parking lot performing several types of dance routines, including b-boying and krumping, as well as backflips. During most scenes in the video, they are seen dressed in the colours of maroon, white and navy blue.

In August 2010, Justice Crew performed "And Then We Dance" on Sunrise. They also held an instore performance of the song at the Sanity music store in Westfield Hurstville on 7 September . On 27 September, Justice Crew performed the song on The X Factor (Australia), and at the 2010 NRL Grand Final on 3 October. Justice Crew held more instore performances of "And Then We Dance" at the Richmond Records store in Windsor, New South Wales on 16 October, and at Westfield Liverpool on 28 October 2010.

Track listing
Digital download
 "And Then We Dance" – 3:00

Personnel
Tom Coyne – mastering engineer
Justice Crew – vocals
Damien Lewis – mastering engineer
Darhyl Camper – production, writing
Nicholas "RAS" Furlong – production, writing
Phil Tan – mixing engineer
Jordan"Infinity"Suecof – production, writing
Source:

Charts and certification

Weekly charts

Year-end charts

Certification

References

2010 songs
2010 debut singles
Justice Crew songs
Electropop songs
Sony Music Australia singles
Songs written by Infinity (producer)
Songs written by Darhyl Camper
Songs written by Nicholas Furlong (musician)